The Ambassador is a 2005 Norwegian television documentary film directed by Erling Borgen. It is a Norwegian production, produced by Erling Borgen for INSIGHT TV.

Synopsis
The film examines the career of John Negroponte, focusing primarily on his time as U.S. Ambassador to Honduras in the early 1980s. It brings to light the militaristic aspects of his service in the region in relation to the Reagan Doctrine. Interviews with numerous Central American human rights activists point to Negroponte's alleged complicity in war crimes not only in his nation of diplomatic assignment, but also in neighboring El Salvador as a part of the Salvadoran Civil War and in Nicaragua as an aid to the Contras. The documentary covers forced disappearance as part of this involvement including the disappearance of 179 Hondurans and specific examples such as the case of Father James Carney, whose brother is interviewed. The film also contains interviews with former U.S. Ambassador to Honduras Jack R. Binns, Negroponte's predecessor; indigenous Guatemalan activist Rigoberta Menchú, and Salvadoran bishop Medardo Gómez.

References

External links

The Ambassador (Ambassadøren) Norwegian Film Institute
L’ambassadeur Festival international du film des droits de l'homme de Paris

2005 films
2005 television films
2005 documentary films
Enforced disappearance
Documentary films about war
Documentary films about refugees
Documentary films about war crimes
Films set in Honduras
Films set in Nicaragua
Films set in Central America
2000s Spanish-language films
2000s English-language films
2000s Norwegian-language films
Documentary films about Latin America
Norwegian documentary films
Nicaraguan Revolution
Documentary films about the Salvadoran Civil War
Documentary films about American politics
2005 multilingual films
2000s American films